Ranjitsinhrao Gaekwad (8 May 1938 – 10 May 2012) was an Indian politician.

Early life and education
Born 8 May 1938 at Ootacamund, Ranjitsinhrao Gaekwad was the second son of Maharaja Pratap Singh Rao Gaekwad (r. 1939–1951), and Maharani Shantadevi Gaekwad (d. 2002), daughter of Sardar Hausrkar Mansinhrao Subbarao of Hasur in Kolhapur. Her daughter, Mrunalini Devi Puar was the Chancellor of The Maharaja Sayajirao University of Baroda. He also obtained post graduate degree in fine arts from Maharaja Sayajirao University of Baroda.

He was the younger brother of Fatehsinghrao Gaekwad, who was the titular Maharaja of Baroda from 1951 to 1971. In the 26th amendment to the Constitution of India promulgated in 1971, the Government of India abolished all official symbols of princely India, including titles, privileges, and remuneration (privy purses).

Death
Ranjitsinh died on 10 May 2012, aged 74, in Vadodara.

Career
Gaekwad was a member of the Indian National Congress and was elected to the Lok Sabha for two terms from Baroda from 1980 to 1989. Ranjitsinhrao Gaekwad was also a well-known painter.

In His Memory

A two days festival of The Maharaja Ranjitsinh Gaekwad Festival of Arts is annually organized, in his memory at the Durbar Hall in Laxmi Vilas Palace. 
This festival celebrates the spirit of Ranjitsinh Gaekwad’s life as an artist and musician many prominent artists like Ustad Fazal Qureshi, Anand Bhate, Sukhad Mande, and many more preforms live performances.

During the festival, the Raja Ravi Varma Award for Excellence in the Field of Visual Arts was presented to veteran artist Jayant Parikh and posthumously to artists late Jyotsna Bhatt and late Rini Dhumal.

A scholarship is also given to meritorious MSU Faculty of Performing Arts students.

References

External links
 Genealogy of princely state of Baroda at Queensland University
 Ranjitsinh Gaekwad's bust to be installed in Kirti Mandir, Vadodara

2012 deaths
People from Vadodara
1938 births
India MPs 1980–1984
India MPs 1984–1989
Maharaja Sayajirao University of Baroda alumni
Ranjitsinh
Lok Sabha members from Gujarat
Indian National Congress politicians from Gujarat